Euler Motors is an Electric Vehicle (EV) start-up based in Delhi, and was founded in 2018. It is headquartered in Delhi, India.
It has its customers like the grocery companies BigBasket.

Euler Motors was founded in 2018 by the entrepreneur Saurav Kumar.

Awards 
Euler Motors is the winner of Apollo Awards, 2022 and also the winner of Businessworld's Auto World 40 Under 40 Winners felicitated by Nitin Gadkari, Union Minister of Road Transport & Highways.

References

Indian companies established in 2018
Electric vehicle manufacturers of India
Companies based in New Delhi
Privately held companies of India